Rudolph John Mucha (July 22, 1918 – September 7, 1982) was an American football guard for the Cleveland Rams and the Chicago Bears of the National Football League. He was also a consensus All-American collegiate center for the University of Washington in 1940. Mucha was the first Washington Husky in school history to be taken in the first round of the NFL draft. Mucha was named to the 1939 College Football All Polish-American Team.

References

 Obituary

1918 births
1982 deaths
American people of Polish descent
American football guards
Great Lakes Navy Bluejackets football players
Chicago Bears players
Cleveland Rams players
Washington Huskies football players
All-American college football players
United States Navy personnel of World War II
Players of American football from Chicago